Pataneswari is the tutelary deity of the city of Patna of Bihar, India.

References
Regional Hindu goddesses